Operation Kraai (Operation Crow) was a Dutch military offensive against the de facto Republic of Indonesia in December 1948 after negotiations failed. With the advantage of surprise the Dutch managed to capture the Indonesian Republic's temporary capital, Yogyakarta, and seized Indonesian leaders such as de facto Republican President Sukarno. This apparent military success was however followed by guerrilla warfare, while the violation of the Renville Agreement ceasefire diplomatically isolated the Dutch, leading to the Dutch–Indonesian Round Table Conference and recognition of the United States of Indonesia.

Referred as the second  by the Dutch, it is more commonly known in Indonesian history books and military records as Agresi Militer Belanda II (Dutch Military Aggression II).

Background

The second  was aimed at forcing the republic to co-operate with the Dutch government in the implementation of the federalist policy as stipulated in the Linggadjati Agreement. The purpose was to organise the new Indonesia as a federal state that would remain closely associated with the Netherlands. The Indonesians had breached the armistice signed following Operation Product. That armistice, the Renville Agreement, stipulated the withdrawal of Indonesian forces from Dutch-occupied territory in exchange for ending the Dutch naval blockade. The Indonesian military originally complied with the agreement, but secretly returned some time later and began guerrilla operations against the Dutch.

By September 1948, the Dutch military command had succeeded in decoding the republic's encrypted secret code, gaining crucial intelligence on Indonesian military and diplomatic strategies and plans. This allowed General Simon Hendrik Spoor to counteract republic actions on the battlefield and diplomatic stage. The Dutch were so confident of this advantage that they began organising a press conference in Jakarta explaining their actions three days before the attack was actually launched, to be held when it commenced. The Dutch also timed their attack to co-ordinate with plans by the Indian Prime Minister Jawaharlal Nehru to dispatch a private plane to fly Sukarno and Mohammad Hatta to Bukittinggi in West Sumatra where they would head an emergency government. A republican delegation led by Sukarno would then be flown to New York via New Delhi to advocate the republic's cause in the United Nations General Assembly. Throughout the Indonesian National Revolution, newly independent India had been sympathetic to the republic's cause, which they viewed as a struggle against Western imperialism.

On 18 December, radio broadcasts in Jakarta reported that the Dutch High Commissioner, Louis Beel, was going to give an important speech the next day. This news did not reach Yogyakarta because the Dutch had cut the communication line. Meanwhile, Spoor gave an instruction to begin a full-scale surprise attack against the Republic. He timed the attack prior to coincide with Tentara Nasional Indonesia military exercises on 19 December, giving Dutch movements some temporary camouflage and enabling them to take the enemy by surprise. The attack was also launched without the prior knowledge of the UN Committee of Good Offices.

Battle

First offensive 

The first offensive began in the early hours of 19 December. At 04:30, Dutch aircraft took off from Bandung; heading for Yogyakarta via the Indian Ocean. Meanwhile, the Dutch High Commissioner Beel announced that the Dutch were no longer bound by the Renville Agreement on radio. The operation began as the Dutch attacked major Indonesian centres in Java and Sumatra. At 05:30, Maguwo airfield and the radio station at military aircraft including Yogyakarta was bombed by the Royal Netherlands East Indies Air Force. The republic fielded only three captured Japanese Mitsubishi Zeros whereas the ML-KNIL had several American-built P-40 Kittyhawk and P-51 Mustang fighters, B-25 Mitchell bombers and 23 Douglas DC-3s carrying approximately 900 troops.

Dutch paratroopers landed at Maguwo airfield, which was defended by 47 lightly armed Indonesian Air Force cadets who lacked anti-aircraft machine guns. In advance, dummies were landed by the Dutch to draw enemy fire which enabled Dutch fighter planes to strafe the defenders. The skirmish lasted for 25 minutes ending with the Dutch taking over Maguwo; killing 128 republicans with no casualties. Having secured the airfield perimeter by 06:45, the Dutch were able to land airborne troops in two successive waves and use Maguwo as an airhead for reinforcements from their main base in Semarang. At 8:30 am, General Spoor gave a radio broadcast ordering his forces to cross the Van Mook line and capture Yogyakarta to "purge" the republic of "unreliable elements".

The main aim of Operation Kraai was to quickly destroy the Tentara Nasional Indonesia (TNI) which Spoor thought would desperately defend their capital. Thus, with Dutch superiority both in the air and on land, the Dutch army would easily execute a final and decisive victory upon the Indonesian army. However, most of the TNI had left Yogyakarta, defending western Yogyakarta's border from another Dutch military campaign. The commander General Nasution himself was on an inspection tour in East Java. The air attack found the Indonesians unprepared and within hours, the advancing Dutch army had quickly taken the airfield, main road, bridge and strategic locations. General Sudirman's strategy was to avoid any major contact with the Dutch main army, thus saving the Indonesians from total defeat. He would prefer to lose territory but gain extra time to consolidate his army.

Capture of Yogyakarta 
After hearing of the surprise attack, Indonesian military commander General Sudirman broadcast Perintah kilat (quick command) via radios. He also requested Sukarno and other leaders to evacuate and join his guerrilla army. After a cabinet meeting, they refused and decided to stay in Yogyakarta, and keep communicating with the United Nations and Komisi Tiga Negara (Trilateral Commission) envoys. Sukarno also announced a plan for "emergency government" in Sumatra, in the event something happened to the Indonesian leadership in Yogyakarta.

Meanwhile, 2,600 fully armed Dutch troops (infantry and paratroopers) led by Colonel Dirk Reinhard Adelbert van Langen had gathered in Maguwo, ready to capture Yogyakarta. On that same day most of Yogyakarta fell into Dutch hands, with key targets like the air force and chief-of-staff headquarters razed by both Indonesian "scorched earth" tactics and Dutch bombing. Indonesian President Sukarno, Vice-President Mohammad Hatta, and ex prime minister Sutan Sjahrir were seized by the Dutch and subsequently exiled to Bangka. They let themselves be captured hoping it would outrage international support. However, this action was later criticised among Indonesian military circles which regarded it as an act of cowardice by the political leadership. Sultan Hamengkubuwono IX stayed at his palace in Yogyakarta and did not leave during the entire occupation. The Sultan himself refused to co-operate with the Dutch administration and rejected mediation attempts by the pro-Dutch Sultan of Pontianak Hamid II.

By 20 December, all remaining republican troops in Yogyakarta had been withdrawn. All parts of Indonesia except Aceh and some cantons in Sumatra fell under Dutch control. Sudirman, who was suffering from tuberculosis, led the guerrillas from his sickbed. General Abdul Haris Nasution, military commander of Java territories, declared military government in Java and initiated a new guerrilla tactic called Pertahanan Keamanan Rakyat Semesta (Nation in Arms), transforming the Javan countryside into a guerrilla front with civilian support.

A previously-planned emergency government was declared on 19 December, the Emergency Government of the Republic of Indonesia, based on Bukittinggi, West Sumatra, led by Sjafruddin Prawiranegara. Sudirman radioed his immediate support for this government.

Aftermath 
This attack was well publicised internationally with many newspapers, including those in the United States, condemning Dutch attacks in their editorials. The United States threatened to suspend Marshall Plan aid to the Dutch. This included funds vital for Dutch post-World War II rebuilding that had so far totalled $US 1 billion. The Netherlands government had spent an amount equivalent to almost half of this funding their campaigns in Indonesia. The perception that American aid was being used to fund "a senile and ineffectual imperialism" encouraged many key voices in the United States – including those amongst the US Republican Party – and from within American churches and NGOs to speak out in support of Indonesian independence.

On 24 December, the UN Security Council called for the end of hostilities. In January 1949, it passed a resolution demanding the reinstatement of the republican government. The Dutch had achieved most of their objectives and announced a ceasefire in Java on 31 December and on 5 January in Sumatra. The guerrilla war nonetheless continued. Hostilities eventually ended on 7 May with the signing of the Roem–Van Roijen Agreement.

References

Footnotes

Bibliography 

 
 
 

 
 Operation Kraai (General Spoor) vs Surat Perintah no. 1 (General Sudirman), Gramedia Publisher-Indonesian Language

1948 in Indonesia
1948 in the Dutch East Indies
Kraai
December 1948 events in Asia
Indonesian National Revolution
Battles of the Indonesian National Revolution
Kraai